Helio Melo (born January 10, 1968) is a former American politician and a Democratic member of the Rhode Island House of Representatives representing District 64 from January 2005 until 2017. He did not seek reelection in 2016. "

Education
Melo attended the University of Rhode Island.

Elections
2004 Melo challenged District 64 incumbent Representative Brian Coogan in the four-way September 14, 2004 Democratic Primary, winning with 970 votes (62.1%) and won the three-way November 2, 2004 General election with 3,274 votes (70.4%) against Republican nominee Michael Robinson and Independent candidate Julie Silva.
2006 Melo was unopposed for both the September 12, 2006 Democratic Primary, winning with 877 votes and the November 7, 2006 General election, winning with 3,767 votes.
2008 Melo was unopposed for both the September 9, 2008 Democratic Primary, winning with 602 votes and the November 4, 2008 General election, winning with 4,102 votes.
2010 Melo was unopposed for both the September 23, 2010 Democratic Primary, winning with 972 votes and won the November 2, 2010 General election with 2,847 votes.
2012 Melo was unopposed for both the September 11, 2012 Democratic Primary, winning with 1,227 votes and also the November 6, 2012 General election, winning with 3,773 votes.
2014 Melo was unopposed in the Democratic primary on September 9, 2014. He defeated Republican Robert Botelho in the General election on November 4, 2014 with 2,137 votes (75.8%).

References

External links
Official page at the Rhode Island General Assembly
Campaign site

Helio Melo at Ballotpedia
Helio Melo at OpenSecrets

Place of birth missing (living people)
1968 births
Living people
Democratic Party members of the Rhode Island House of Representatives
People from East Providence, Rhode Island
Politicians in East Providence, Rhode Island
University of Rhode Island alumni
21st-century American politicians